The 1979 NFL season was the 60th regular season of the National Football League. The season ended with Super Bowl XIV when the Pittsburgh Steelers repeated as champions by defeating the Los Angeles Rams 31–19 at the Rose Bowl. The Steelers became the first team to win back-to-back Super Bowls twice.

Draft
The 1979 NFL Draft was held from May 3 to 4, 1979 at New York City's Waldorf Astoria New York. With the first pick, the Buffalo Bills selected linebacker Tom Cousineau from the Ohio State University.

New Officials
Jerry Seeman was promoted to referee succeeding Don Wedge who returned to being a deep wing official, primarily as a back judge, where he continued to officiate through 1995. Seeman served as a crew chief for 12 seasons, working Super Bowl XXIII and Super Bowl XXV before leaving the field to succeed Art McNally as NFL Vice President of Officiating from 1991 to 2001.

Major rule changes
 Whenever the quarterback is sacked, the clock will be stopped for at least five seconds and then restarted again. (The stoppage was eliminated effective the 2014 NFL season.)
 If a fair catch is made, or signaled and awarded to a team because of interference, on the last play of a half or overtime, the period can be extended and the team can run one play from scrimmage or attempt a fair catch kick.
 The league's jersey numbering system was modified to allow defensive linemen wear numbers 90 to 99, in addition to 60 to 79. And centers were allowed to wear 60–79, in addition to 50 to 59.
 Players are prohibited from wearing torn or altered equipment. Tear-away jerseys are banned.
 During kickoffs, punts, and field goal attempts, players on the receiving team cannot block below the waist.
 The zone in which crackback blocks are prohibited is extended from 3 yards on either side of the line of scrimmage to 5.
 Players cannot use their helmets to butt, spear, or ram an opponent. Any player who uses the crown or the top of his helmet unnecessarily will be called for unnecessary roughness.
 In order to prevent incidents such as the Holy Roller game, the following change is made: If an offensive player fumbles during a fourth down play, or during any down played after the two-minute warning in a half or overtime, only the fumbling player can recover and/or advance the ball. This change is known as the "Ken Stabler rule" after the Oakland Raiders quarterback who made the infamous play in the Holy Roller game. In officiating circles, it's known as the "Markbreit rule" after Jerry Markbreit, who was the referee for that game.
Uprights were extended to 30 feet above the crossbar.

Division Races
Starting in 1978, ten teams qualified for the playoffs: the winners of each of the divisions, and two wild-card teams in each conference.

National Football Conference

American Football Conference

Final standings

Tiebreakers
 San Diego was the top AFC playoff seed based on head-to-head victory over Pittsburgh (1-0).
 Seattle finished ahead of Oakland in the AFC West based on head-to-head sweep (2–0).
 Dallas finished ahead of Philadelphia in the NFC East based on better conference record (10–2 to Philadelphia's 9–3).
 Tampa Bay finished ahead of Chicago in the NFC Central based on better division record (6–2 to Chicago's 5–3).
 Chicago was the second NFC Wild Card ahead of Washington based on better net points in all games (+57 to Washington's 53).

Playoffs

Statistical leaders

Team

Awards

Coaching changes

Offseason
Cincinnati Bengals: Homer Rice began his first full season as the team's head coach. He replaced Bill Johnson after the Bengals started the 1978 season at 0–5.
Oakland Raiders: John Madden retired and was replaced by Tom Flores. 
New England Patriots: Ron Erhardt was named as permanent head coach. The team had suspended Chuck Fairbanks for the last regular season game in 1978. Fairbanks had been in talks all that season to join the University of Colorado Buffaloes, breaching his contract with the Patriots. Coordinators Erhardt and Hank Bullough took over as co-interim head coaches for that final 1978 game. Fairbanks was reinstated as head coach two weeks later for the Divisional Playoffs, but left in the off-season to join Colorado.
New York Giants: John McVay was fired and replaced by Ray Perkins.
San Diego Chargers: Don Coryell began his first full season as Chargers head coach. He replaced Tommy Prothro, who was fired after a 1–3 start in 1978.
San Francisco 49ers: Bill Walsh was hired as the new 49ers head coach. Pete McCulley was fired after a 1–8 start in 1978, and Fred O'Connor served as interim for the last seven games.

In-season
St. Louis Cardinals: Bud Wilkinson was fired after the team started the season at 3–10 for refusing to bench longtime starting quarterback Jim Hart in favor of Steve Pisarciewicz. Personnel director Larry Wilson, a Hall of Fame safety for the team from 1960-72 and later the franchise's general manager, served as interim for the last three games.

Uniform changes
 Several changes were made to the officiating uniforms, including:
 Referees were outfitted with black identifying hats, while all other officials continued to wear white hats. This was the same as the Canadian Football League at the time, but the opposite of American high school and college football.
 For the first time, each official's position was identified on his shirt. The position was abbreviated on the front pocket of the shirt and then spelled out on the back above the number.
 The numbering system for officials was altered, with officials numbered separately by position (3 through 20) rather than as an entire group, making duplicate numbers among officials common.
 The TV numbers on the Dallas Cowboys' blue jerseys moved from the sleeves to the shoulders, matching the white jerseys, which moved the TV numbers to the shoulders in 1974.
 The New York Giants began wearing their white pants with their white jerseys, discontinuing their blue pants
 The Washington Redskins replaced their gold pants with burgundy pants with their white jerseys and white pants with their burgundy jerseys. The shade of burgundy was also darkened. 
The San Diego Chargers replaced the blue and white stripe on the yellow pants with a white lightning bolt outlined in blue.

Television
This was the second year under the league's four-year broadcast contracts with ABC, CBS, and NBC to televise Monday Night Football, the NFC package, and the AFC package, respectively.

Fran Tarkenton began serving as a fill-in color commentator for ABC, while Bryant Gumbel became the sole host of NBC's pregame show NFL '79.

Dick Enberg and Merlin Olsen replaced Curt Gowdy and John Brodie as NBC's lead commentary team. Rather than demote Gowdy, NBC traded him away to CBS for Don Criqui. With Pat Summerall and Tom Brookshier remaining as CBS' lead commentary team, and Vin Scully and George Allen as the #2 team, Gowdy was paired with Hank Stram as the network's #3 team.

Deaths

February
February 26- Urban Henry, Age 43, Defensive Tackle for the Los Angeles Rams in 1961, the Green Bay Packers in 1963, and Pittsburgh Steelers in 1964.

March
March 10- Beattie Feathers, age 69, Running Back for the Chicago Bears from 1934-1937, Brooklyn Dodgers from 1938-1939, and Green Bay Packers in 1940. First player in NFL history to rush for over 1,000 yards in a season (1,004)in 1934.

June
June 22- Troy Archer, age 24, Defensive Tackle for the New York Giants from 1976-1978

October
October 5- Ken Strong, age 73, Receiver, Defensive Back, and Placekicker for the Staten Island Stapletons from 1929-1932, and New York Giants from 1933-1947. Inducted in the Pro Football Hall of Fame in 1967.

Notes

References
 NFL Record and Fact Book
 NFL History 1971–1980 (Last accessed December 4, 2005)
 Total Football: The Official Encyclopedia of the National Football League

National Football League seasons